Héctor Elizondo Nájera (born 7 August 1925) is a Mexican former sport shooter. He competed in the 25 metre rapid fire pistol event at the 1960 Summer Olympics. He is the older brother of Jesús Elizondo.

References

1925 births
Possibly living people
Mexican male sport shooters
Olympic shooters of Mexico
Shooters at the 1960 Summer Olympics
Sportspeople from Tampico, Tamaulipas